Aromas may refer to:
 Odors, particularly pleasant ones, or
 Aromas, California, or
 Aromas, Jura, one of the 545 communes of the Jura département, in France
 Aromas Coffee, an Australian coffee house